Henry Stuart Foote (February 28, 1804May 19, 1880) was a United States Senator from Mississippi and the chairman of the United States Senate Committee on Foreign Relations from 1847 to 1852. He was a Unionist Governor of Mississippi from 1852 to 1854 and an American Party supporter in California. During the American Civil War, he served in the First and Second Confederate Congresses. A practicing attorney, he published two memoirs related to the Civil War years, a book on Texas before its annexation and a postwar book on the legal profession and courts in the Southern United States.

Early life
Henry S. Foote was born on February 28, 1804, in Fauquier County, Virginia. He was the son of Richard Helm Foote and Catherine (Stuart) Foote. He pursued classical studies in 1819 and graduated from Washington College (now Washington and Lee University). He later studied the law and was admitted to the bar in 1822.

Career
Foote moved to Alabama in 1824, where he began his law practice in Tuscumbia. He also established a Democratic newspaper. He became a co-founder and trustee of LaGrange College, later known as the University of North Alabama. Shortly after, he moved to Mississippi, where he practiced law in the state capital, Jackson, and in the river towns of Natchez, Vicksburg, and Raymond, which were centers of business associated with the cotton and slave trades. He also visited the state of Texas and wrote a two-volume book about it.

Foote served as a Democratic Senator from 1847 to 1852. He was the chairman of the United States Senate Committee on Foreign Relations. He played a key role in securing the Compromise of 1850. During Senate debates over the projected compromise resolutions, Thomas Hart Benton refused to support the compromise and became enraged by Foote's verbal attacks. According to the historian James Coleman, during heated Senate debates over the projected compromise resolutions, Foote drew a pistol on Benton after Benton charged him. Other members wrestled Foote to the floor; they took the gun away and locked it in a drawer. The incident created an uproar that prompted an investigation by a Senate committee.

Foote defeated Jefferson Davis to succeed John A. Quitman as the governor of Mississippi from 1852 to 1854. He was elected on a Unionist platform at a time of increasing sectional tension. It was the last Unionist ticket in Mississippi. Foote resigned and moved to California, where he practiced the law in San Francisco and joined the American Party. Foote was considered a leading candidate for United States Senate from California, but by the votes of every Democratic state senator, alongside abolitionist American Party state senator, Wilson G. Flint, the office went unfilled. He campaigned for the Fillmore–Donelson ticket in the 1856 presidential campaign.

American Civil War

On the eve of the American Civil War of 1861–1865, Foote returned to Vicksburg. In 1859, he was a member of the Southern convention in Knoxville. He moved to Tennessee and settled in Nashville, where he was elected to the First and Second Confederate Congresses. As a member of the Confederate House of Representatives, he often harshly criticized the war policies of the Confederate President Jefferson Davis. In one debate, he verbally attacked the Confederate States Secretary of State Judah P. Benjamin, and expressed virulent antisemitism.

Early in 1865, Foote attempted to cross to U.S. lines and travel to Washington, D.C. but was arrested by Confederates before he could do so. The Confederate House of Representatives voted to expel him on January 24, 1865, but the vote failed to garner the necessary two-thirds majority. Later, he was appointed a Mississippi Commissioner for Confederate POWs held by the U.S. Army (his son among them). He resigned from office in 1865 and moved to Washington, where he sought a meeting with President Lincoln but was refused. Given the choice of leaving the United States or being sent back to the Confederacy, Foote fled to Canada and later to London. There he started writing a memoir of the war years.

Postbellum career
After the war, Foote returned to Nashville, Tennessee, where he practiced law. He was also a frequent visitor to Washington, D.C. He joined the Republican Party in 1875. He attended the 1876 Republican National Convention. He published two memoirs and a history of the law in the region. He was then appointed by President Rutherford B. Hayes to serve as the superintendent of the New Orleans Mint from 1878 to 1880. His final public speech, delivered in 1879, was a civil rights speech, and he advocated for the cause in his memoirs.

Personal life and death

Foote was married twice. With his first wife, Elizabeth Winters, he had two sons and three daughters. His son Henry S. Foote Jr. served in the Confederate States Army and later as a superior court judge in California. His other son, W. W. Foote, also served in the CSA and ran for the U.S. Senate as a Democrat from California in 1892. One of his daughters married Nevada Senator William Morris Stewart.

Foote had a third son with his second wife, Rachel Douglas Boyd Smiley. They briefly resided at Old Central in West Nashville, a house built in 1858 on land she had inherited from her grandfather, John Boyd, a congressman for the Republic of Texas. The land and house later became property of Vanderbilt University, where it still stands today. His third son moved to California.

Foote died on May 19, 1880, in Nashville, Tennessee. He was buried in the Smiley family plot at the Mount Olivet Cemetery in Nashville. His second wife Rachel died in 1882.

Bibliography
Texas and the Texans; or, Advance of the Anglo-Americans to the South-west; Including a History of Leading Events in Mexico, from the Conquest by Fernando Cortes to the Termination of the Texan Revolution (1841).
War of the Rebellion (1866).
Casket of Reminiscences (1874).
The Bench and Bar of the South and Southwest (1876).

Footnotes

Further reading
Coleman, James P. "Two Irascible Antebellum Senators: George Poindexter and Henry S. Foote." Journal of Mississippi History 46 (February 1984): 17–27.
Evans, Eli N. Judah P. Benjamin: The Jewish Confederate, New York: The Free Press, 1988
Ezekiel, Herbert T. and Gaston Lichtenstein, The History of the Jews of Richmond from 1769 to 1917, 1917
Gonzales, John Edmond. "Henry Stuart Foote: Confederate Congressman and Exile," Civil War History 11 (December 1965): 384–95.

External links

 
 Works by Henry S. Foote on the Internet Archive
 Henry Stuart Foote Family website

1804 births
1880 deaths
19th-century American politicians
Alabama lawyers
California Know Nothings
Mississippi lawyers
Tennessee lawyers
Mississippi Democrats
Mississippi Unionists
Governors of Mississippi
Democratic Party United States senators from Mississippi
Members of the Confederate House of Representatives from Tennessee
People from Fauquier County, Virginia
People from Nashville, Tennessee
People from Tuscumbia, Alabama
University of North Alabama people
Washington and Lee University alumni
Unionist Party state governors of the United States
Democratic Party governors of Mississippi
Chairmen of the Senate Committee on Foreign Relations
Tennessee Republicans